The 2010–11 ice hockey tournament, called the Luxembourg Cup, was the 12th occurrence of the cup. Four teams participated in the tournament, which was won by Lokomotive Luxembourg.

Regular season

Playoffs

3rd place 
 IHC Beaufort - Puckers Luxembourg 8:2

Final 
 Lokomotive Luxembourg - Tornado Luxembourg 5:2

External links 
 Season on icehockey.lu

Luxembourg Cup
Luxembourg Cup (ice hockey) seasons